Murphy Kumonple Nagbe (born June 7, 1984) is a Liberian footballer (defender) who played for LISCR FC.

Career
The defensive midfielder is also a member of the Liberia national football team.

References

External links 
 
 
 
 

1984 births
Living people
Liberian footballers
Liberia international footballers
Association football midfielders
PSMS Medan players
Expatriate footballers in Indonesia
Sportspeople from Monrovia
Durban Stars F.C. players
National First Division players